Zbigniew Jacek Namysłowski (9 September 1939 – 7 February 2022) was a Polish jazz alto saxophonist, flautist, cellist, trombonist, pianist and composer.

Life and career
Namysłowski was born in Warsaw, Poland, on 9 September 1939. He performed on the Krzysztof Komeda album Astigmatic recorded in 1965. He collaborated with such artists as Janusz Muniak, Leszek Możdżer, Vladislav Sendecki, Michał Urbaniak, and Andrzej Trzaskowski. Namysłowski died on 7 February 2022, at the age of 82.

Selected discography
 Lola (1964; Decca)
 Zbigniew Namyslowski Quartet (muza XL0305) recorded 1966 Poland vol 6
 Krzysztof Komeda: Astigmatic (1966)
 Winobranie (1973)
 Kuyaviak Goes Funky (1975)
 Zbigniew Namyslowski (1977)
 Jasmin Lady (1978)
 Future Talk (1979)
 Air Condition (1981)
 Open (1987)
 Without A Talk (1991)
 The Last Concert (1992)
 Secretly & Confidentially (1993)
 Zbigniew Namysłowski & Zakopane Highlanders (1995)
 Cy to blues cy nie blues (1997) Dances (1997)
 3 Nights (1998)
 Mozart Goes Jazz (1998)
 Jazz & Folk - Namyslowski Quartet & Górale (2000)
 Go! (2003)
 Standards (2003)
 Assymetry (2006)
 Live at Kosmos, Berlin 1965 (2008)
 Nice & Easy (2009)

Sideman
 Krzysztof Komeda Astigmatic (1966)
 Laszlo Gardony Quartet Reggae for Zbiggy'' (1984)

References

External links
 https://web.archive.org/web/20070306183150/http://zbigniew.namyslowski.com/zneng.html
 Official website 
Zbigniew Namysłowski at Culture.pl
 
 

1939 births
2022 deaths
21st-century saxophonists
Jazz saxophonists
Musicians from Warsaw
Polish jazz musicians
Recipients of the Gold Medal for Merit to Culture – Gloria Artis
20th-century saxophonists